Amanda MacKay is a model, television host, and journalist. She has been a host for MTV Canada, G4techTV, and GameTrailers TV on Spike TV.

Biography
MacKay grew up in the Vancouver, British Columbia suburb of Coquitlam, where she attended Sir Fredrick Banting Junior Secondary School and was chosen as a finalist for a modelling competition with Seventeen magazine. She also attended and wrote for the Centennial School newspaper. She graduated from the British Columbia Institute of Technology with a degree in broadcast journalism and began her career as co-host of MTV Canada's flagship series Select. She went on to host and segment produce the "TRL" style show for seven seasons.

In addition to Select, while at MTV Canada, MacKay hosted and produced the network's only other original program, World Chart Express, a weekly show that highlighted music from around the globe. 

MacKay previously hosted the news show Pulse on G4techTV, and writes a gaming and tech article for Soak Magazine. She is also the host of Hardcore Candy, a syndicated all girls' action sports show, and co-host for various GameTrailers.com original shows, such as GTTV with Geoff Keighley.

MacKay hosts segments for Spike TV web site. Additionally, she has been featured on segments of "Kurt the Cyber Guy," co-hosted Fuel TV's "Design for Humanity" special and the Arby's Action Sports Awards seen on Fox Sports and Fuel as well as guest-hosted for "Entertainment Tonight Canada."

MacKay's acting roles include "The 4400" on USA Network and the independent feature Rebuy.

External links

Female models from British Columbia
People from Coquitlam
Canadian television hosts
British Columbia Institute of Technology alumni
Year of birth missing (living people)
Living people
Canadian women television hosts